The Qiang people (Qiangic: Rrmea) are an ethnic group in China. They form one of the 56 ethnic groups officially recognised by the People's Republic of China, with a population of approximately 310,000 in 2000. They live mainly in a mountainous region in the northwestern part of Sichuan (Szechwan) on the eastern edge of the Tibetan Plateau.

Names
However, they did not define themselves with the Chinese term "Qiang ethnicity" until 1950, when they were officially designated Qiāngzú.

History 

People called "Qiang" have been mentioned in ancient Chinese texts since 3,000 years ago when they first appeared in oracle bone inscriptions. However, this term was applied to a variety of groups that might not be the same as the modern Qiang. Many of the people formerly designated as "Qiang" were gradually removed from this category in Chinese texts as they become sinicised or reclassified. By the Ming and Qing dynasties, the term "Qiang" denoted only non-Han people living in the upper Min River Valley and Beichuan area, the area now occupied by the modern Qiang. Nonetheless, most modern scholarship assume modern Qiang are descended from the historical Qiang people.

When Qiang was officially designated an ethnic group in 1950, they numbered only 35,600. Many sought to gain Qiang status due to government policy of prohibition of discrimination as well as economic subsidies for minority nationalities. The number of Qiangs has therefore increased due to the reclassification of people, resulting in large numbers of people changing their ethnicity to Qiang. From 1982-1990, 75,600 Han people changed their ethnicity to Qiang, and from 1990-2000, 96,500 Han people became Qiang. Another 49,200 people reclaimed their Qiang ethnicity from 1982-1989. In total, some 200,000 Han people became Qiang. As a result, there were 300,000 Qiang people as of 2010, 200,000 of which lived in Sichuan, predominantly in the Ngawa Tibetan and Qiang Autonomous Prefecture, Beichuan Qiang Autonomous County and in the counties of Mao, Wenchuan, Li, Heishui, and Songpan.

On 12 May 2008, the Qiang people were heavily affected by the 2008 Sichuan earthquake, as more than 30,000 of the people killed were ethnic Qiangs (10 percent of the total Qiang population).

Genetics and origin
Genetic evidence reveals a predominantly Northern Asian-specific component in Qiangic populations, especially in maternal lineages. The Qiangic populations are an admixture of the northward migrations of East Asian initial settlers with Y chromosome haplogroup D (D1-M15 and the later originated D3a-P47) in the late Paleolithic age, and the southward Di-Qiang people with dominant haplogroup O3a2c1*-M134 and O3a2c1a-M117 in the Neolithic Age.

Languages
The Qiang speak the agglutinative Qiangic languages, a subfamily of the Tibeto-Burman languages. However, Qiang dialects are so different that communication between different Qiang groups is often in Mandarin.  There are numerous Qiang dialects; traditionally they are split into two groups, Northern Qiang and Southern Qiang, although in fact the Qiang language complex is made up of a large number of dialectal continua which cannot be easily grouped into Northern or Southern. The education system largely uses Standard Chinese as a medium of instruction for the Qiang people, and as a result of the universal access to schooling and TV, very few Qiang cannot speak Chinese but many Qiang cannot speak Qiangic languages.

Until recently,  In the late 1980s a writing system was developed for the Qiang language based on the Qugu (曲谷) variety of a Northern dialect using the Latin alphabet.  The introduction has not been successful due to the complexities of the Qiang sound system and the concomitant difficulty of its writing system, as well as the diversity of the Qiang dialects and the lack of reading material. The Qiang also use Chinese characters. More recently, a unique script has been developed specifically for Qiang, known as the Qiang or Rma script.

Customs

Qiang territory lies between the Han Chinese and Tibetan inhabited areas of Historical Tibet and China respectively and the Qiang would fall under the domination of both. There was also infighting between different villages and the Qiang constructed watchtowers and houses with thick stone walls and small windows and doors due to the constant threat of attack. Each village may have had one or more stone towers in the past, and these Himalayan Towers still survive in some Qiang villages and remain a distinctive feature in these villages.

Culture and lifestyle 

The Qiang today are mountain dwellers. A fortress village, zhai , composed of 30 to 100 households, in general, is the basic social unit beyond the household. An average of two to five fortress villages in a small valley along a mountain stream, known in local Chinese as gou , make up a village cluster (cun ). The inhabitants of fortress village or village cluster have close contact in social life. In these small valleys, people cultivate narrow fluvial plains along creeks or mountain terraces, hunt animals or collect mushrooms and herbs (for food or medicine) in the neighboring woods, and herd yaks and horses on the mountain-top pastures.

Owing to its ethnic diversity, Qiang culture has influenced and been influenced by other cultures. Generally, those who live nearer to the Tibetans are influenced by the Tibetan culture, while the majority are more influenced by a Mandarin Chinese, which has close links with its ethnic history.

Both the menfolk and womenfolk wear gowns made of gunny cloth, cotton, and silk with sleeveless wool jackets. Following age-old traditions, their hair and legs are bound. The womenfolk wear laced clothing with decorated collars, consisting of plum-shaped silver ornaments. Sharp-pointed and embroidered shoes, embroidered girdles and earrings, neck rings, hairpins and silver badges are also popular.

Millet, highland barley, potatoes, winter wheat and buckwheat serve as the staple food of the Qiang. Consumption of wine and smoking of orchid leaves are also popular among the Qiangs.

The Qiang live in granite stone houses generally consisting of two to three stories. The first floor is meant for keeping livestock and poultry, while the second floor is meant for the living quarters, and the third floor for grain storage. If the third floor does not exist, the grains will be kept on the first or second floor instead.

Skilled in construction of roads and bamboo bridges, the Qiang can build them on the rockiest cliffs and swiftest rivers. Using only wooden boards and piers, these bridges can stretch up to 100 meters. Others who are excellent masons are good at digging wells. Especially during poor farming seasons, they will visit neighboring places to do chiseling and digging.

Embroidery and drawn work are done extemporaneously without any designs. Traditional songs related to topics such as wine and the mountains are accompanied by dances and the music of traditional instruments such as leather drums.

Religion 

The majority of the Qiang adhere to a pantheistic religion involving belief in a supreme God of Heaven (Mubyasei) and a variety of gods of nature and of human affairs. Others, who live near the Tibetans, follow Tibetan Buddhism. There are as well very small minorities of Muslims.

The Qiang worship five major gods, twelve lesser gods, some tree gods, and numerous stones were also worshiped as representatives of gods. A special god is also worshiped in every village and locality, who are mentioned by name in the sacred chants of the Qiang priests. Mubyasei, also known Abba Chi, is the supreme god of the universe and the same name is also used to refer to a male ancestor god, Abba Sei. In certain places, Shanwang, the mountain god, is considered to represent the supreme god. The Qiang people have also adopted many practices of the Taoists.

For some Qiangs, consecrated white stones, believed to be imbued with powers of the gods through certain rituals, are placed on the top of towers as a good luck symbols. These squared stone towers are traditionally located on the edge of Qiang villages and on the top of nearby hills as well.

See also 
 Northern Qiang language
 Southern Qiang language

References

Citations

Sources

External links 
 http://ultra.ihp.sinica.edu.tw/~origins/pages/barbarbook4.htm
 Cimulin Qiang ethnic profile by Asia Harvest - a Christian missionary endeavour
 Qianghistory.co.uk

 
Ethnic groups officially recognized by China
Culture in Sichuan